Al-Baha Domestic Airport is an airport serving Al-Baha (also spelled Al Bahah), the capital of Al Bahah Province in Saudi Arabia. The airport was launched on 1 June 1983.

Facilities

Airlines and destinations

See also 

 Jizan Regional Airport 
 General Authority of Civil Aviation
 Abha international Airport

References

External links
 
 
 

1983 establishments in Saudi Arabia
Airports established in 1983
Airports in Saudi Arabia
Al-Bahah Province